Slovenia competed at the 2019 World Aquatics Championships in Gwangju, South Korea from 12 to 28 July.

Open water swimming

Slovenia qualified one female open water swimmers.

Women

Swimming

Slovenia entered four swimmers.

Men

Women

References

World Aquatics Championships
Nations at the 2019 World Aquatics Championships
2019